Ethyl xanthic acid is an organic compound with the chemical formula . It can be viewed as an O-ethyl ester of dithiocarbonic O,S-acid (the formula of that acid is ). Ethyl xanthic acid belongs to the category of thioacids, where the prefix thio- means that an oxygen atom in the compound is replaced by a sulfur atom.

Preparation
Ethyl xanthic acid is obtained by the action of dilute sulphuric acid on potassium ethyl xanthate at 0 °C.

Properties
Ethyl xanthic acid is a colorless unstable oily liquid. It decomposes above  into carbon disulfide and ethanol.

Esters of ethyl xanthic acid

The methyl and ethyl esters of ethyl xanthic acid are colorless, oily liquids with a penetrating odor.

Reactions
Ethyl xanthic acid reacts with water or moisture producing carbon disulfide.

Safety
In an experiment with white rats, chronically exposed rats by inhalation of ethyl xanthic acid revealed higher frequency of chromosomal rearrangements in lymphocytes of peripheral blood than the control rats.

References 

Sulfur compounds